Gate of Destiny is an annual signature professional wrestling pay-per-view (PPV) created and promoted by the Japanese professional wrestling promotion Dragon Gate. The event has been held annually since 2007 as a pay-per-view (PPV). Attendance stayed constant until 2009. Since 2009, the attendance increased until 2011 and the 2012 Gate of Destiny featured also Dragon Gate USA championship matches. On 2013, the attendance increased with 7100 persons. The best attendance was 7150 persons. The event is part of the Crown Gate tour. The 2020 edition of the event was held with a limited audience due to in part to the ongoing COVID-19 pandemic at the time.

Event chronology

2007

2008

2009

2010

2011

2012

2013

2014

2015

2016

2017

2018

2019

2020

2021

2022

Notes

References

External links
The official Dragon Gate website
Champion Gate at Iheartdg.com 

Recurring events established in 2007
Dragon Gate (wrestling)